"Lever" is a song by the Australian alternative rock group The Mavis's. The song was released in July 1998 as the third single from their second studio album, Pink Pills (1998). The single peaked at number 88 on the ARIA Charts

Track listing

Charts

References

1998 songs
1998 singles
Mushroom Records singles